
Gmina Trzebiatów is an urban-rural gmina (administrative district) in Gryfice County, West Pomeranian Voivodeship, in northwestern Poland.

Villages
Apart from the town of Trzebiatów, the gmina contains the villages and settlements of Bieczynko, Bieczyno, Chełm Gryficki, Chomętowo, Gąbin, Gołańcz Pomorska, Gorzysław, Gosław, Kłodkowo, Lewice, Mirosławice, Mrzeżyno, Nowielice, Paliczyno, Roby, Rogowo, Rogozina, Sadlenko, Sadlno, Siemidarżno, Trzebusz, Wlewo, Włodarka and Zapolice.

Neighbouring gminas 
Gmina Trzebiatów is bordered by the gminas of Brojce, Gryfice, Karnice, Kołobrzeg, Rewal, Rymań, and Siemyśl.

References 

Polish official population figures 2006

Trzebiatow
Gryfice County